The Nene Viaduct is a railway bridge immediately south of Peterborough railway station in Cambridgeshire, Eastern England. It was built to carry the Great Northern Railway across the River Nene. It is a Grade II* listed building.

History and design
The Nene Viaduct was built in 1850 by father and son Sir William Cubitt and Joseph Cubitt for the Great Northern Railway to carry their main line across the River Nene just south of Peterborough. It is bridge number 184 on what is today the East Coast Main Line.

The viaduct was constructed using cast iron and consists of six ribs bolted together to form two segments, spanning the River Nene in three arches. It is supported by two piers in the water, which each consist of three pairs of fluted columns; these rest on caissons that are sunk into the river. Steel bracing beneath the arches forms a walkway and the spandrels contain diamond-shaped latticework. At the top is a decorative balustrade, also of cast iron. The abutments are of brick construction, twelve arches on the south bank and three on the north. 

The bridge has a plaque that claims that the Nene Viaduct is the last surviving cast-iron structure on a main railway line in Britain. The plaque originally attributed the bridge incorrectly to Lewis Cubitt, but this has now been amended to Joseph Cubitt. The bridge has been strengthened several times through its history, including with steel ties in 1910 and additional work in 1914, but continues to carry high-speed trains today.

The railway line was quadrupled  in 1924, at which time a second bridge was constructed alongside the Nene Viaduct. The second is a steel truss bridge and is not considered by Historic England to be of special interest.

See also

Grade II* listed buildings in Peterborough
List of railway bridges and viaducts in the United Kingdom

References

Grade II* listed railway bridges and viaducts
Grade II* listed buildings in Cambridgeshire
Railway viaducts in Cambridgeshire
Bridges across the River Nene
Buildings and structures in Peterborough